Borys Illich Oliynyk (Boris Ilich Oleynik; 22 October 1935 – 30 April 2017) was a Ukrainian poet, translator, and political activist. He served in the Verkhovna Rada from 1992 to 2006 and was chairman of the Ukrainian Culture Fund.

Before his death, Oliynyk was the most prominent representative of the national-communist movement within the Communist Party of Ukraine.

In 2005, he was awarded the title "Hero of Ukraine."

While being Ukrainian, Oliynyk also officially adopted a Russian version of his last name as Oleynik.

References

1935 births
2017 deaths
Burials at Baikove Cemetery
People from Poltava Oblast
Communist Party of Ukraine politicians
First convocation members of the Verkhovna Rada
Second convocation members of the Verkhovna Rada
Third convocation members of the Verkhovna Rada
Fourth convocation members of the Verkhovna Rada
Recipients of the USSR State Prize
Recipients of the title of Hero of Ukraine
Recipients of the Order of Prince Yaroslav the Wise, 3rd class
Recipients of the Honorary Diploma of the Cabinet of Ministers of Ukraine